Chevery Airport  is located on the north-eastern shore of the Gulf of Saint Lawrence, Quebec, Canada in the town of Chevery. It is uncontrolled but has an automated weather observation system (AWOS).

Airlines and destinations

References

External links
Page about this airport on COPA's Places to Fly airport directory
Transport Canada - Information on Chevery Airport

Certified airports in Côte-Nord